Frank Garcia (born June 5, 1957 in Tucson, Arizona) is a former American football punter in the National Football League. He was signed by the Seattle Seahawks as an undrafted free agent in 1981. He played college football at Arizona, Arizona State and UNLV.

Garcia also played for the Tampa Bay Buccaneers.

1957 births
Living people
Players of American football from Tucson, Arizona
American football punters
Arizona Wildcats football players
Arizona State Sun Devils football players
UNLV Rebels football players
Seattle Seahawks players
Tampa Bay Buccaneers players